The University of Parma (UNIPR) is a public university in Parma, Emilia-Romagna, Italy. It is organised in nine departments. As of 2016 the University of Parma has about 26,000 students.

History
During the 13th-14th centuries there was an educational institution, studium, in Parma, but it was closed in 1387 by Gian Galeazzo Visconti, Duke of Milan. The university was opened in 1412 by Niccolò III d'Este, and, although no papal bull was issued, the degrees were granted. In 1420 Filippo Maria Visconti closed it again.

Although there were several attempts to revive the university, it functioned only as a "paper university", granting degrees without teaching. In 1601, the university was finally reopened by Ranuccio I Farnese, and the papal bill was given. It was a joint institution with a Society of Jesus, and a third of staff were teachers from a local Jesuit school, who taught in a separate building and by Jesuit curriculum. There were usually about 27-32 teachers and 300-400 students in the 17th century. Logic, natural history, mathematics and theology were taught by Jesuits and law and medicine by civil teachers. Among the most important Jesuits who taught in Parma should be mentioned Giovanni Battista Riccioli, and Daniello Bartoli.

In 1768, Ferdinand I expelled Jesuits and the curriculum was modernized. Student protests resulted in closure of the university by Marie Louise, Duchess of Parma, in 1831; only in 1854 did Louise Marie Thérèse of Artois re-open it. The university then comprised faculties of theology, law, medicine, physics and mathematics, philosophy, and literature, as well as schools of obstetrics, pharmacy, and veterinary medicine.

After the Risorgimento, the government of newly united Italy divided the universities of the country into two grades. In 1862, the University of Parma was declared grade B, its financing was reduced, and the quality of education degraded. It was equalized with grade A universities only in 1887.

Notable people
Francesco Accarigi (c. 1557–1622), professor of civil law
Cesare Beccaria  (c. 1738–1794), economist and criminologist
Attilio Bertolucci (1911–2000), poet
Alberto Broggi (born 1966), engineer
Marta Catellani, chemist
Flavio Delbono (born 1959), economist and politician
Vittorio Gallese (born 1959), neuroscientist
Beppo Levi (1875–1961), mathematician
Macedonio Melloni (c. 1798—1854), physicist
Giuseppe Mingione (born 1972), mathematician
Bernardino Ramazzini (c. 1633–1714), professor of medicine and father of Occupational Medicine
Giacomo Rizzolatti (born 1937), neuroscientist
Cesare Zavattini (1902–1989), screenwriter

Organization

The university is now divided into 9 departments.

 Department of Chemistry, Life Sciences and Environmental Sustainability 
 Department of Economics and Management
 Department of Engineering and Architecture
 Department of Food and Drug
 Department of Humanities, Social Sciences and Cultural Industries
 Department of Law, Politics and International Studies
 Department of Mathematical, Physical and Computer Sciences
 Department of Medicine and Surgery
 Department of Veterinary Science

From 2012 to 2016 the university was divided into 18 departments:

 Department of Arts and Literature, History and Social Studies
 Department of Biomedical,  Biotechnological and translational Sciences
 Department of Chemistry 
 Department of Civil, Environmental, Land Management, Engineering and  Architecture - DICATEA
 Department of Classics, Modern Languages, Education, Philosophy (A.L.E.F.)
 Department of Clinical and experimental Medicine 
 Department of Economics
 Department of Food Science
 Department of Industrial Engineering 
 Department of Information Engineering
 Department of Law
 Department of Life sciences
 Department of Mathematics and Computer Science 
 Department of Neuroscience
 Department of Pharmacy
 Department of Physics and earth sciences “Macedonio Melloni” 
 Department of Surgery 

The university was formerly divided into 12 faculties:

 Faculty of Agriculture
 Faculty of Architecture
 Faculty of Arts and Philosophy
 Faculty of Economics
 Faculty of Engineering
 Faculty of Law
 Faculty of Mathematics, Physics and Natural Science.  
 Faculty of Medicine and Surgery
 Faculty of Pharmacy
 Faculty of Political Sciences
 Faculty of Psychology
 Faculty of Veterinary Medicine

Research Labs in the  Department of Engineering and Architecture

 Industrial Automation Laboratory
 IoT Lab

See also 
 European College of Parma
 List of Italian universities
 List of medieval universities
 ICoN Interuniversity Consortium for Italian Studies
 Library assessment

References

Books

See also
 List of Jesuit sites

External links
 University of Parma Website  
 Itinerari medievali: risorse per lo studio del Medioevo 
 Scholars and Literati at the University of Parma (1412–1800), Repertorium Eruditorum Totius Europae – RETE

 
Veterinary schools
Universities and colleges in Emilia-Romagna
Education in Parma
Buildings and structures in Parma
University of Parma
962 establishments
Veterinary medicine in Italy